David Lyle Mack (born June 10, 1940, in Portland, Oregon) is an American diplomat.

He is the former Deputy Assistant Secretary of State for Near Eastern Affairs (1990–1993) and U.S. Ambassador to the United Arab Emirates (1986–1989).

Mack also served as the Principal Officer in Iraq from May 1977 until February 1978.

He is a non-resident Scholar at the Middle East Institute in Washington, D.C., and served as the Senior Vice President.

Education
 B.A. (1962) and M.A. (1964) from Harvard University,
 American University of Cairo as a Fulbright fellow, 1964–1965

References

1940 births
20th-century American academics
20th-century American diplomats
21st-century American academics
21st-century American diplomats
Academics from Oregon 
Ambassadors of the United States to the United Arab Emirates
American expatriates in Egypt
American expatriates in Iraq
The American University in Cairo alumni
Harvard University alumni
Living people
People from Portland, Oregon